Deighton is a village and civil parish in the unitary authority of the City of York, North Yorkshire, England. The population of the civil parish as of the 2011 census was 291.  It lies on the A19 about five miles south of York.   According to the 2001 census the parish had a population of 308.

The village was historically part of the East Riding of Yorkshire until 1974. It was then a part of the Selby District in North Yorkshire from 1974 until 1996. Since 1996 it has been part of the City of York unitary authority.

The parish also includes most of the hamlet of Crockey Hill.

The name Deighton comes from Old English and means farmstead surrounded by a ditch.

Governance
The parish is currently part of Wheldrake Ward in the City of York. As of 2019 it is represented by Cllr Christian Vassie from the local Liberal Democrats.

References

External links

Villages in the City of York
Civil parishes in North Yorkshire